Beighton may refer to:

People
 Graham Beighton (born 1939), English footballer 
 Henry Beighton (1687–1743), English engineer and surveyor
 Nick Beighton  (born 1981), British paracanoeist 
 Peter Beighton (born 1934), British geneticist 
 Sean Beighton (born 1988), American curler
 Thomas Beighton (1790–1844), English missionary

Fictional characters
 Miss Beighton, a character in Kipling's short story Cupid's Arrows

Places
 Beighton, Norfolk, England
 Beighton, South Yorkshire, Sheffield, England
Beighton railway station (closed 1954)
Beighton Junction, a series of railway junctions
Beighton (ward), the ward within Sheffield
 Beighton Fields, Derbyshire, England

Other uses
 Beighton Cup, a field hockey tournament in India
 Beighton score, a measure of joint hypermobility

See also